Edinburgh Law School, founded in 1707, is a school within the University of Edinburgh, Scotland, United Kingdom dedicated to research and teaching in law. It is located in the historic Old College, the original site of the University. Two of the twelve currently sitting Supreme Court of the United Kingdom justices are graduates of Edinburgh, including the current President and Deputy President.

In 2014, the Research Excellence Framework commissioned by the UK government, ranked the University of Edinburgh 1st in Scotland and 4th in the UK. The 2022 league table rankings from The Guardian placed Edinburgh at 10th in the UK. The 2022 Complete University Guide league rankings placed Edinburgh at 8th in the UK. The 2018 The Times league rankings placed Edinburgh at 11th in the UK.

History

In 1707, the year of the unification of the Kingdoms of Scotland and England into the Kingdom of Great Britain, Queen Anne established the Chair of Public Law and the Law of Nature and Nations in the University of Edinburgh, to which Charles Erskine (or Areskine) was appointed; this was the formal start of the Faculty of Law. By 1722 the University had four Professors of Law, and classes—in Civil Law, Scots Law and History—were usually given in their respective homes or offices. Numbers grew with the expansion of the legal profession in the 19th century, and by 1830 there were over 200 students attending the Scots Law class alone. Scholarship amongst the academics at Edinburgh continued to grow in reputation, with the work of Muirhead, Lorimer and Rankine achieving international renown.

The Faculty of Law had moved to Old College, built in 1789, and in 1862 the new degree of LL.B. (Bachelor of Laws) was introduced, following the Universities (Scotland) Act 1858. The degree was only open to graduates, usually those who had studied for the M.A.(Arts) at a Scottish University or the B.A. at Oxford or Cambridge. Students of the LL.B. had to attend courses and be examined in Civil Law, Conveyancing, Public law, Constitutional law and History, and Medical Jurisprudence; Edinburgh was the only University to offer this degree for some time. In 1909 Eveline MacLaren and Josephine Gordon Stuart became Scotland's first two female law graduates when they each obtained an LL.B degree from Edinburgh. By 1966, the LL.B. had become a full-time undergraduate course, although many would continue to study for an Arts degree beforehand. In 1981, Edinburgh first offered the Diploma in Legal Practice, for LL.B. students wishing to enter the legal profession.

Today, the School of Law is associated both with traditional Scots law and with innovation across a wide range of subjects. The School retains a reputation for scholarship in topics such as Roman Law but is also known as a centre for research in topics such as European law, criminology, commercial law, intellectual property and information technology law, labour law, European private law, medical law and ethics, international law, comparative law, and human rights law. In 2007 the School celebrated its Tercentenary year, marked by a series of events and of lectures by world-renowned legal experts.

Academics

Throughout its history the School (or Faculty) of Law has accommodated some of the leading legal scholars in Europe. James Muirhead's work on Roman Law garnered international praise, Professor Erskine's Principles (1754) became a standard text in Scots Law, as did those of Professor George Joseph Bell. In the 20th-century, the eminent legal theorist Professor Sir Neil MacCormick wrote his seminal texts on legal philosophy as Regius Professor at Edinburgh.

Current members of Edinburgh Law School include current Regius Professor Neil Walker; Lord President Reid Professor of Law Alexandra Braun; Professor of European Union Law Professor Niamh Nic Shuibhne; the academic and novelist Professor Alexander McCall Smith; former Judge at the European Court of First Instance Sir David Edward KC, former Scottish Law Commissioners Emeritus Professor George Gretton, Professor Hector MacQueen, Professor Gerry Maher KC, Professor Andrew Steven, Professor Kenneth Reid and Emeritus Professor Robert Black KC architect of the Pan Am Flight 103 bombing trial).

Student activity

Students of the School of Law are represented by the Law Students' Council. The University of Edinburgh Law Society, known as LawSoc, provides a programme of social events. In addition, there is a Postgraduate Students' Research Committee for doctoral level students, as well as a Graduate Law Students' Society. The University Mooting Society is active, with two internal competitions and several external competitions running during each academic session, giving students the opportunity to develop the skills of oral legal argument. For graduate-level students there are a number of subject-specific discussion groups which meet on a regular basis. Since 2008, the students have published the Edinburgh Student Law Review.

Research centres
 The Centre for Law and Society
 The Centre for Legal History
 "SCRIPT" (The AHRC Centre for Studies in Intellectual Property and Technology Law)
 The Edinburgh Centre for Legal Theory
 The Edinburgh Centre for Private Law
 The Europa Institute
 The Scottish Centre for International Law
 The Joseph Bell Centre for Forensic Statistics and Legal Reasoning, joint research collaboration with Glasgow Caledonian University
 The Edinburgh Study of Youth Transitions and Crime
 The Centre for Commercial Law, Chaired by The Rt Hon. Lord Reed

Famous graduates
Notable alumni of Edinburgh Law School include:

 Douglas Alexander MP, former Secretary of State for International Development
 Michael Ancram QC, Marquess of Lothian, former MP and Chairman of the Conservative Party
 Henry Brougham, Lord High Chancellor of Great Britain, co-founder of the University College London
 Joanna Cherry, current Scottish National Party MP for Edinburgh South-West
 James Clyde, Baron Clyde, Lord of Appeal in Ordinary
 Thomas Campbell, poet
 George Combe, founder of the Edinburgh Phrenological Society
 William Cullen, Baron Cullen of Whitekirk, Lord President of the Court of Session and Lord of Appeal in Ordinary 
 Alistair Duff, former Director of the Judicial Institute of Scotland 
 Henry Dundas, 1st Viscount Melville, Lord Advocate of Scotland, British Home Secretary, first Secretary of State for War and First Lord of the Admiralty
 Robert Dundas of Arniston, the younger, Lord Advocate of Scotland, Lord President of the Court of Session 
 Sir David Edward QC, former Judge at the European Court of Justice
 Nicholas Fairbairn, Conservative MP for Perth and Kinross and Solicitor General for Scotland
 Robert J. Faucher, U.S Assistant Secretary of State for Conflict and Stabilization Operations
 Brian Gill, Lord Gill, former Lord President (Ph.D)
 Peter Goodrich, Director of Law and Humanities at the Benjamin N. Cardozo School of Law (Ph.D.)
 Katherine Grainger, 2012 Olympic Gold Medallist
 Arthur Hamilton, Lord Hamilton, Lord President of the Court of Session
 Lord Hodge, sitting Justice of the Supreme Court of the United Kingdom 
 Michael Hay, founder of Hay, Kalb & Associates, the first (and to date only) foreign law firm in North Korea
 Lord Hope of Craighead, former Lord of Appeal in Ordinary and inaugural Deputy President of the Supreme Court of the United Kingdom
 Eleanor Laing, Deputy Speaker of the House of Commons
 Lord Mackay of Clashfern, former Lord Chancellor and Lord Advocate of Scotland
 Stuart McDonald, current Scottish National Party MP for Cumbernauld, Kilsyth and Kirkintilloch East
 David McLetchie MSP, former Scottish Conservative leader
 David Mundell, current Conservative MP and Secretary of State for Scotland
 Ian Murray, current Labour MP and Shadow Secretary of State for Scotland
 Lord Reed, sitting Justice and current Deputy President of the Supreme Court of the United Kingdom
 Sir Malcolm Rifkind QC MP, former Foreign Secretary
 Sir Walter Scott, writer and poet, (Sheriff-Deputy of Selkirk)
 Julia Sebutinde, current member of the International Court of Justice and first African woman to serve as member of the Court
 Alexander McCall Smith, Emeritus Professor of Medical Law at the University of Edinburgh, co-founder of the law school at the University of Botswana, adult mystery author
 Matt Soper, current member of the Colorado House of Representatives and first Seventh-day Adventist to serve as member of the Colorado Legislature
 David Steel, Baron Steel of Aikwood, former Presiding Officer of the Scottish Parliament and former leader of the Liberal Party
 Robert Louis Stevenson, writer
 Colin Sutherland, Lord Carloway, Lord President of the Court of Session
 Simon Taylor, Scottish Rugby Footballer
 Lord Wallace QC, former Deputy First Minister of Scotland and Advocate General for Scotland
 Sir Thomas Winsor, HM Chief Inspector of Constabulary and former Rail Regulator and International Rail Regulator

Famous faculty

 Sir Neil MacCormick, Regius Professor of Public Law and the Law of Nature and Nations
 Harvey McGregor QC, visiting professor, Warden of New College, Oxford

References 

Edinburgh
Edinburgh
Edinburgh
Law